American Tire Distributors (ATD) is an American distributor and retailer of automotive parts and supplies, including tires and wheels. The company has locations across the United States and Canada.

History 
J.H. Heafner Co. was founded in Lincolnton, North Carolina in 1935. The company acquired Winston Tire Company in 1997, and moved ATD's headquarters from Lincolnton to Charlotte in 1998. Heafner Tire sold Winston Tire Company to Performance Management, Inc. in 2001. In 2000, Heafner Group acquired American Tire Distributors. Heafner Tire changed its name to American Tire Distributors (ATD) in 2002.

American Tire Distributors was acquired by TPG Capital in 2010.

In 2018, Goodyear Tire and Rubber Company announced that it would no longer use American Tire Distributors to distribute its products. The announcement caused the value of ATD shares to plummet. Bridgestone ended its partnership with ATD soon after Goodyear's announcement, leaving the company without two of its largest manufacturers.

ATD filed for Chapter 11 bankruptcy protection in October 2018, seeking to cut $1.1 billion of the company's debt. ATD received assistance refinancing from investors, including Wells Fargo. The company emerged from bankruptcy in December 2018.

The company struggled to recover in the wake of filing bankruptcy due to the loss of its relationship with several major tire manufacturers. American Tire Distributors had an annual revenue of $5 billion in 2019. In February 2021, Goldman Sachs led talks on a $1 billion junk bond deal to refinance ATD, which had not recovered from the loss of major manufacturing partners.

As of 2021, Forbes lists the company as the 81st largest privately owned company in the United States.

References 

Automotive part retailers of the United States
1935 establishments in North Carolina
Automotive companies of the United States
Companies based in Charlotte, North Carolina